Sister, Sister may refer to:

 Sister, Sister (TV series), a television sitcom starring Tia and Tamera Mowry
 Sister, Sister (1982 film), a TV movie starring Diahann Carroll
 Sister, Sister (1987 film), a thriller starring Eric Stoltz
 Sister, Sister (book), by Andrew Neiderman
 Sister Sister (drag queen), a drag performer in RuPaul's Drag Race UK (series 2)